Shirley Blumberg (CM, OAA, FRAIC, AIA) (born February 4, 1952) is a Canadian architect. She is a founding partner of KPMB Architects in Toronto, a Canadian practice. In 2013, Blumberg was invested as a Member of the Order of Canada "for her contributions to architecture and for her commitment to creating spaces that foster a sense of community." Notable projects include the Centre for International Governance Innovation (CIGI) Campus, 2011 which is the recipient of the Royal Institute of British Architects International Award (2012), the Architectural Record “Good Design is Good Business Award” (2013) and the Governor General's Medal for Excellence (2014).

Biography
Blumberg was born in Cape Town, South Africa, and graduated from the University of Cape Town in 1972. She immigrated to Canada in opposition to Apartheid in her home country in 1974, after spending a year in London, England. She completed her education in Canada graduating with Honours from the University of Toronto School of Architecture in 1976.
 
In 1977, she joined Barton Myers Associates, Inc. in Toronto and worked 10 years as an associate until Myers decided to move his office to Los Angeles. This catalyzed Blumberg to join forces with three other associates of Barton Myers – Bruce Kuwabara, Thomas Payne and Marianne McKenna – to form Kuwabara Payne McKenna Blumberg Architects (KPMB), in 1987.

Blumberg has focused on projects of architecture that benefit society and has directed a range of projects that speak to issues of pluralism, housing, and community building. This work includes the Japanese Canadian Cultural Centre in Don Mills, Ontario and the Toronto Community Housing, Block 32 and adjacent Fort York Branch Library. Current projects include the Global Centre for Pluralism for the Aga Khan in Ottawa and the Lawrence Heights Redevelopment in Toronto. She is also the partner-in-charge of the Remai Modern Art Gallery of Saskatchewan (Mendel Art Gallery), the Ronald O. Perelman Center for Political Science and Economics at the University of Pennsylvania, and 20 Washington Road for Princeton University. Blumberg is also part of the campus framework planning effort for Princeton University with Urban Strategies and Michael Van Valkenburgh and Associates.

Blumberg is a member of the Toronto Community Housing Design Review Panel, and has served on the City of Toronto Design Review Panel. In 2014 Blumberg served on the design review panel for the memorial to the Victims of Communism. Proposed to be located on one of the last pieces of open land in the parliamentary district of Canada's capital, Ottawa, Blumberg voted against the design and catalyzed a protest against the initiative and the location.

Shirley led the gelling of the Design Exchange, an architectural clash including the 1990s Ernst & Young Tower, 1930s Moderne machismo and a 1960s Mies van der Rohe's Toronto-Dominion Centre next door. She was partner-in-charge of this $8 million project at Kuwabara Payne McKenna Blumberg, the architecture firm that won the job in January 1988, after beating 40 other design firms in an interview process. Her attention to detail and thought process for every part of the Design Exchange allowed her to unify these clashing architectural styles into one distinguished building. Beyond using a variety of materials, Shirley used them in virtuosic ways, saying, “we wanted to demonstrate their limits, to see how far we could push them.” During this project she says, "design isn’t just people sitting around and sketching on a drawing board. It’s a huge industry with many collaborators, from designers to fabricators to suppliers.” 

Some of Blumberg's public service included being a part of the seven-member jury that evaluated finalists for new Ottawa Memorial to the Victims of Communism. Her main criticism to the project was why a memorial to victims of communism was so prominent and so “centrally placed that it would seem to quite overshadow Canada’s true history,” as well as the memorial not being able to be built for the estimated price of $5.5 million.

Selected Projects
 1994: The Design Exchange, Toronto, Ontario
 1996: Alliance Communications Corporation Head Office
 1997: Alias|wavefront Studios
 1997: Disney Television Animation Studios
 1997: Ammirati Puris Lintas, New York City, New York
 2000: Penthouse on the Waterfront
 2000: Cardinal Ambrozic Houses of Providence
 2003: James Stewart Centre for Mathematics, McMaster University, Hamilton, Ontario
 2004: Centennial College Applied Research and Innovation Centre, Scarborough, Ontario
 2004: University of Toronto Scarborough (UTSC) Faculty of Management
 2005: Canada's National Ballet School (in joint venture with Goldsmith Borgal & Company Ltd. Architects), Toronto, Ontario
 2006: Gardiner Museum, Toronto, Ontario
 2008: Japanese Canadian Cultural Center, Toronto, Ontario
 2008: SugarCube, Denver, Colorado
 2009: Block 24 E, Railway Lands West (NEO & Montage Condominiums), Toronto, Ontario
 2009: One Bedford Residential Development, Toronto, Ontario
 2009: University Boulevard Project, University of British Columbia, Vancouver, British Columbia
 2010: TIFF Bell Lightbox and Festival Tower, Toronto, Ontario
 2011: Vaughan City Hall, Vaughan, Ontario (LEED Gold)
 2011: Centre for International Governance Innovation, CIGI Campus, Waterloo, Ontario
 2011: Maple Leaf Square (Bremner Blvd), Toronto, Ontario
 2012: Block 32, Toronto Community Housing Corporation, Toronto, Ontario (in association with Page and Steele / IBI Group Architects)
 2012: Toronto Community Housing Corporation, 150 Dan Leckie Way, Toronto, Ontario 
 2013: Audain Art Centre, University of British Columbia, Vancouver, British Columbia   
 2013: Ponderosa Commons Phase I, University of British Columbia, Vancouver, British Columbia (in joint venture with Hughes Condon Marler Architects)
 2013: Elementary Teachers' Federation of Ontario, Toronto, Ontario
 2013: Sugino Studio, Toronto, Ontario
 2014: Library District Condominiums, Toronto, Ontario (in association with Page and Steele / IBI Group Architects)
 2014: Fort York Branch Library, Toronto, Ontario
 2015: Ponderosa Commons Phase II, University of British Columbia, Vancouver, British Columbia (in joint venture with Hughes Condon Marler Architects)
 2015: Robert H. Lee Alumni Centre, University of British Columbia, Vancouver, British Columbia
 2015: Jack Layton Ferry Terminal and Harbour Square Park, Toronto, Ontario
 2016: 20 Washington Road, Princeton University, Princeton, New Jersey
 2017: Julis Romo Rabinowitz Building & Louis A. Simpson International Building, Princeton University, Princeton, New Jersey
 2017: Global Center for Pluralism, Ottawa, Ontario  
 2017: Remai Modern Art Gallery of Saskatchewan, Saskatoon, Saskatchewan 
 2018: Lawrence Heights, Toronto, Ontario
 2018: Ronald O. Perelman Center for Political Science and Economics, University of Pennsylvania, Philadelphia, Pennsylvania
 2018: 11 Wellesley, Toronto, Ontario
 2020 Landscape of Landmark Quality, University of Toronto, Toronto, Ontario

References

External links 

 Finding aid for the Kuwabara Payne Mckenna Blumberg fonds, Canadian Centre for Architecture

Canadian women architects
1952 births
Living people
People from Cape Town
People from Toronto
Members of the Order of Canada
University of Toronto alumni
University of Cape Town alumni